Jocy is a name. Notable people with the name include:

 Jocy or Joazhifel Soares (born 1991), Santomean football player
 Jocy Barros (born 1985), Santomean football player
 Jocy de Oliveira (born 1936), Brazilian pianist and composer

See also
 Jacy